Aniello may refer to:

Given name
Aniello Ascione (1680–1708), Italian painter of still lifes
Aniello Califano (1870–1919), Italian poet and writer
Aniello Campagna (1607–1648), Roman Catholic prelate, Bishop of Nusco
Lee Aniello Castaldo (1915–1990), American jazz trumpeter and bandleader
Aniello Cutolo (born 1983), Italian footballer
Aniello Dellacroce (1914–1985), American mobster and underboss of the Gambino crime family
Aniello Desiderio (born 1971), Italian virtuoso classical guitarist and teacher
Aniello Falcone (1600–1656), Italian Baroque painter
Agnolo Aniello Fiore (15th century), Italian sculptor architect
Angelo Aniello Fiore (died 1500), Italian architect and sculptor
Aniello Formisano (born 1954), Italian politician and lawyer
Aniello Panariello (born 1988), Italian footballer
Aniello Portio, Italian engraver who worked at Naples from 1690 to 1700
Aniello Sabbatino (born 2000), Italian rower
Aniello Salzano (born 1991), Italian footballer

Surname
Lucia Aniello (born 1983), Italian-born American director, writer and producer
Ron Aniello, American songwriter, record producer, composer and musician
Tommaso Aniello (1620–1647), Italian fisherman, leader of the revolt against Habsburg Spain

See also
Anielew (disambiguation)
Anielia
Anilio (disambiguation)
Anniela
Arianiello
Daniello
Faniello
Ianniello